Seagren is a surname of Swedish origin. Notable people with the surname include:

Alice Seagren (born 1947), American politician
Bob Seagren (born 1946), American pole vaulter

References

Surnames of Swedish origin